Little Joe 5B was an uncrewed launch escape system test of the Mercury spacecraft, conducted as part of the US Mercury program.  The mission used production Mercury spacecraft # 14A. The mission was launched April 28, 1961, from Wallops Island, Virginia.  The Little Joe 5B flew to an apogee of 2.8 miles (4.5 km) and a range of 9 miles (14 km).  The mission lasted 5 minutes 25 seconds. Maximum speed was 1,780 mph (2865 km/h) and acceleration was 10 g (98 m/s²).  The mission was a success and Mercury spacecraft # 14A was recovered.

Mercury spacecraft #14A used in the Little Joe 5B mission, is currently displayed at the Virginia Air and Space Center in Hampton.

See also
 Little Joe (rocket)

References

This New Ocean: A History of Project Mercury - NASA SP-4201

Project Mercury
1961 in spaceflight